The VTB United League Top Player is an annual VTB United League award that is given to one player from each country that is represented by the league's clubs. The award has been handed out since the 2012–13 season, and it is awarded by the player's citizenship, regardless of the player's club's location.

In the league's countries with just one club, currently six (Latvia, Estonia, Belarus, Czech Republic, Kazakhstan, and Finland), along with Poland in the past, the league itself gives the award. In Russia, which has 10 clubs, Russian news agency TASS (replacing RIA Novosti, from 2014–15), partners with the league to name the top Russian player. In the past, for clubs from Lithuania (three) and Ukraine (two), the league partnered with, respectively, basketnews.lt and basket-planet.com.

Current awards

Top Belarusian Player
The best player from

Top Estonian Player
The best player from

Top Kazakh Player
The best player from

Top Latvian Player
The best player from

Top Russian Player
The best player from

Past awards

Top Czech Player
The best player from the

Top Finnish Player
The best player from

Top Georgian Player
The best player from

Top Lithuanian Player
The best player from

Top Polish Player
The best player from

Top Ukrainian Player
The best player from

References

External links
 VTB United League Official Website 
 VTB United League Official Website 

Top Player